UX Tauri, abbreviated as UX Tau, is a binary star system approximately 450 light-years away in the constellation of Taurus (the Bull). It is notable for the fact that, despite its recent (in stellar terms) creation, the Spitzer Space Telescope discovered that its protoplanetary disk contains a gap. The dust, which normally accumulates in an expanding ring starting right next to the star at such a young age, is either very thin or nonexistent at a range of 0.2 to 56 AU from the star. Typically, this means that the early ancestors of planets may be forming from the disk, though the star only ignited about 1 million years ago. In contrast, Earth was formed approximately 4.54 billion years ago, placing its formation about sixty million years after the Sun's ignition around 4.6 billion years ago.

See also
 HD 98800
 Vega
 V4046 Sagittarii

References

External links
 
 

Circumstellar disks
Binary stars
T Tauri stars
Taurus (constellation)
Hypothetical planetary systems
Tauri, UX
K-type main-sequence stars
M-type main-sequence stars
Emission-line stars
285846
020990